Tin Town is a small suburb of north-east Luton, in the Borough of Luton, in the ceremonial county of Bedfordshire, England. The area is roughly bounded by Moreton Road and Turners Road North to the north, Crawley Green Road to the south, Vauxhall Way to the west, and Ashcroft Road to the east.

History
After the Second World War, there was a severe shortage of accommodation and new building materials were employed in order to save both time and money. The majority were BISF Houses, which used sheetmetal for the upper parts of the construction, hence the local name for the area becoming ‘Tin Town’. Most of these houses still stand today, although in recent years the local council (or private owners) of these houses have covered the original metal with cladding, and only a few of these properties still show the original characteristic painted metal.

Local area
The local area is mainly residential, although Ramridge Primary School, named after the neighbouring Ramridge End is in the area.

Politics 

Tin Town is part of Round Green ward, which also contains parts of Ramridge End and Round Green. The councillors for Round Green ward are Cllr David Chapman (Liberal Democrats), Cllr Mark Rivers (Labour) and Cllr Tahmina Saleem (Labour).

The ward forms part of the parliamentary constituency of Luton South and the MP is Rachel Hopkins (Labour).

Local attractions

Local newspapers
Two weekly newspapers cover Tin Town, although they are not specific to the area. 

They are the:
 Herald and Post
 Luton News

References 

 Local History Book - The Story of Round Green by Barbara M. Benson

Areas of Luton